Tadeusz Miciński (9 November 1873, in Łódź – February 1918, in Cherykaw Raion, Belarus) was an influential Polish poet, gnostic and playwright, and was a forerunner of Expressionism and Surrealism. He is one of the writers of the Young Poland period (Neoromanticism movement). His writings are strong influenced by Dark Romanticism and Romantic gothic fiction, with a focus on moral battles between good and evil. He was called by many a wizard poet and a worshipper of mysteries.

Life
He studied philosophy at the University of Kraków. His work was heavily influenced by Polish messianism and included philosophical and mystical themes.  The most well-known of his poetry collections is W mroku gwiazd (In the Twilight of the Stars), released in 1902, and a 1906 play, Kniaź Patiomkin (Prince Potemkin).

He was friends with the writer and painter Stanisław Ignacy Witkiewicz and the composer Karol Szymanowski, who composed music dedicated to him.

Miciński was assassinated in 1918 during the Russian Revolution, while he was helping to organize the Polish armed forces.

There is a street named for Tadeusz Miciński on the Łódź housing estate

Works
Miciński's prose works, which are hermetic and difficult to make sense of, were based on revealed truth. Through them, the author expressed gnosis, fatalism and the view which holds that only the chosen ones (overmen) can posses a soul and eternal life.

His most popular works are:
Łazarze - The Lazars (1896) - poem, 
Nauczycielka The Teacher (1896) - short story, 
W mroku gwiazd - In the Twilight of the Stars (1902) - poetry collection, 
Kniaź Patiomkin - Prince Potemkin (1906) - drama, 
Do źródeł duszy polskiej - To the origin of the Polish soul (1906) - article, 
W mrokach złotego pałacu, czyli Bazylissa Teofanu (1909) - drama, 
Nietota. Księga tajemna Tatr - Nietota. The Book of Tatra mystery (1910) - novel, 
Walka o Chrystusa - The Fight for Christ (1911) - article, 
Dęby czarnobylskie - The Oaks of Tchernobyl (1911) - short stories compilation, 
Xiądz Faust - Monk Faust (1913) - novel

References

1873 births
1918 deaths
19th-century Polish dramatists and playwrights
Polish male dramatists and playwrights
19th-century Polish poets
Jagiellonian University alumni
Polish Theosophists
Polish male poets
20th-century Polish dramatists and playwrights
20th-century Polish poets
19th-century Polish novelists
20th-century Polish novelists
Polish male novelists